Esther Pilkington is a British performance artist and researcher based in Hamburg, Germany. Pilkington, along with Daniel Ladnar, is a founding member of the performance collective Random People. Her work within the practice of walking art considers the role of the documented journey in performance and breaking the predominant character of immediacy in performance.

Education 
Pilkington received her PhD from Aberystwyth University, Wales, in 2011, her MA also from Aberystwyth University in Theatre, Film and Media Studies in 2007. She studied English and Theatre, Film and Media Studies at the undergraduate level at Frankfurt University, earning her degree in 2006.

Selected works 
 2011 We Always Arrive In the Theatre on Foot: A walk to the theatre in sixteen steps and eighteen footnotes, Vienna, Austria
 2011 Vaasa in Luck, Platform, Finland
 2009 A Long Walk, Aberystwyth to Aldeburgh, UK
 2005 The Sunny Beach Project, Sunny Beach, Bulgaria; Vienna, Austria and Ipswich, UK

References 

Living people
21st-century British women artists
Alumni of Aberystwyth University
British performance artists
Goethe University Frankfurt alumni
Year of birth missing (living people)